The first principal of N.K. Bagrodia is Mr. Mathew Panamkat. 

Educational institutions established in 1991
High schools and secondary schools in Delhi
1991 establishments in Delhi

GG